The 22613 / 22614 Shraddha Sethu Superfast Express is an Express train belonging to Southern Railway zone that runs between  in Tamilnadu and Ayodhya Cantonment (Faizabad) in Uttar Pradesh, India, via Chennai Egmore. It is currently being operated with 22613/22614 train numbers on a weekly basis. From September 19, 2021 it will be upgraded into a Superfast Express with revised coach position by removing AC First Class & Pantry Car. Therefore after September 19, 2021 it runs only with AC Two Tier, AC Three Tier & Sleeper Class.

Service

The train has an average speed of 52 km/hr and covers 2921 km in 53h 10m.

Route and halts 

 
 Tiruchchirappalli
 
 
 Mayiladuthurai
 Tiruppadrippuliyur (Cuddalore) 
 Viluppuram
 
 
 
 
 
 
 
 
 
  (Allahabad) 
 
 Shahganj Junction
 
Ayodhya Cantonment Junction (Faizabad Junction)

Traction 

Coach composition 

The train has standard ICF rakes with a max speed of 110 kmph. Till March 2020, the train has 21 Coaches,

 1 AC First Class 
 2 AC Two Tier
 3 AC Three Tier 
 8 Sleeper Class
 1 Pantry Car
 4 General Unreserved
 2 Luggage Cum Brake Vans.

The service was stopped from March 2020 to September 2021 for nearly one & a half years. It resumes its journey from 21 September 2021, with revised Coach Position by detaching AC First Class & Pantry Car. Now it runs only with 
21 coaches,

 1 AC Two Tier
 3 AC Three Tier
 11 Sleeper Class
 4 General Unreserved
 2 Luggage Cum Brake Vans.

The train consists of 21 coaches.

Schedule

Demands
There are also demands to include more stoppages to this train notability Karaikudi Junction, Sivagangai, Pudukkottai, Ramanathapuram, Paramakudi and Chidambaram.

References

External links 

 16793/Rameswaram–Faizabad Shraddha Sethu Express
 16794/Faizabad–Rameswaram Shraddha Sethu Express

Transport in Rameswaram
Trains from Faizabad
Express trains in India
Rail transport in Tamil Nadu
Rail transport in Andhra Pradesh
Rail transport in Maharashtra
Rail transport in Madhya Pradesh
Railway services introduced in 2017